The 2022 Campeonato Ecuatoriano de Fútbol Serie A, known as the LigaPro Betcris 2022 for sponsoring purposes, was the 64th season of the Serie A, Ecuador's top tier football league, and the fourth under the management of the Liga Profesional de Fútbol del Ecuador (or LigaPro). The season began on 18 February and ended on 13 November 2022.

Aucas won their first Serie A title in this season, defeating Barcelona in the finals by a 1–0 aggregate score. Independiente del Valle were the defending champions.

Teams
16 teams competed in the season. Manta and Olmedo were relegated after finishing in the bottom two places of the aggregate table of the previous season, being replaced by the 2021 Serie B champions Cumbayá and runners-up Gualaceo. Cumbayá clinched promotion to the top flight with three matches in hand after a 2–1 win over Independiente Juniors on 23 September 2021, whilst Gualaceo ensured promotion on 13 October 2021, with a 2–1 victory against Atlético Santo Domingo and a draw for El Nacional against Independiente Juniors. Both promoted teams took part in Serie A for the first time ever.

Stadia and locations

Personnel and kits

Managerial changes

Notes

First stage
The first stage began on 18 February and ended on 29 May 2022.

Standings

Results

Second stage
The second stage began on 8 July and ended on 23 October 2022.

Standings

Results

Finals
The finals (Third stage) were played by Barcelona (first stage winners) and Aucas (second stage winners). The winners of the double-legged series were crowned as Serie A champions and earned the Ecuador 1 berth in the 2023 Copa Libertadores, and the losers were the Serie A runners-up and earned the Ecuador 2 berth in the Copa Libertadores. By having the greater number of points in the aggregate table, Aucas played the second leg at home.

Aucas won 1–0 on aggregate.

Aggregate table

Top scorers

Source: Ecuagol

See also
 2022 Copa Ecuador
 2022 Ecuadorian Serie B
 2022 Segunda Categoría

References

External links
 LigaPro's official website
 Ecuadorian Football Federation

 

A
Ecuador